Arthur Lucas (December 18, 1907 - December 11, 1962), originally from the U.S. state of Georgia, was one of the last two people to be executed in Canada, on 11 December 1962. Lucas had been convicted of the murder of 44-year-old Therland Crater, a drug dealer and police informant from Detroit. He is also assumed to have killed 20-year-old Carolyn Ann Newman, Crater's common-law wife, but was never tried in her death. Crater was shot four times, while Newman was nearly decapitated. The murders took place in Toronto on 17 November 1961.

A ring belonging to Lucas was found in a pool of Newman's blood. When Lucas was arrested, he was found to have recently cut his nails, and blood was found underneath one of them. He also had gunpowder imbedded in his hand. There were bloodstains found in Lucas's car which matched that of Crater and Newman.

Lucas, along with fellow prisoner Ronald Turpin, was executed at the Toronto (Don) Jail by hanging, the only form of civilian capital punishment ever used in post-Confederation Canada, although the military employed execution by firing squad. In 1976, capital punishment for murder was removed from Canada's Criminal Code, but could still be used under the National Defence Act until 1998.

Chaplain Cyrill Everitt attended the double hanging and in 1986, shortly before his death, he revealed that Lucas's head was "torn right off" because the hangman had miscalculated the man's weight and that his head was hanging "by the sinews of his neck".

Lucas maintained his innocence, but said he was at peace with his punishment. He told Everitt that he had done many terrible things in his life and it was finally catching up with him.

References

1907 births
1962 deaths
20th-century executions of American people
20th-century African-American people
People from Daytona Beach, Florida
American people executed for murder
American people executed abroad
American emigrants to Canada
People convicted of murder by Canada
People executed by Canada by hanging

Executed African-American people